The National Bureau of Statistics is a branch of the Government of Tanzania which has the mandate to provide official statistics to the Government of Tanzania, business community and the public at large. It is based in Dodoma and obtains a wide range of economic, social and demographic statistics about the country. The bureau compiled data on every village in Tanzania during the 2002 Tanzanian census in August 2002.

External links
Official site

Government agencies of Tanzania
Tanzania